Chilocarpus is a genus of plant in the family Apocynaceae, first described as a genus in 1823. The genus is native to India, Southeast Asia, and New Guinea.

Species
 Chilocarpus beccarianus Pierre - Borneo
 Chilocarpus conspicuus (Steenis) Markgr. - Borneo
 Chilocarpus costatus Miq. - Borneo, Sumatra, W Malaysia, Thailand, Myanmar
 Chilocarpus decipiens Hook.f. - Sumatra, W Malaysia
 Chilocarpus denudatus Blume - S India, Nicobar Islands, Indochina, Malaysia, Indonesia, New Guinea
 Chilocarpus hirtus D.J.Middleton - Borneo, Sumatra
 Chilocarpus obtusifolius Merr. - Borneo, Sumatra, W Malaysia
 Chilocarpus pubescens D.J.Middleton - Borneo
 Chilocarpus rostratus Markgr. - Borneo, Sumatra, W Malaysia, Thailand
 Chilocarpus sarawakensis D.J.Middleton - Sarawak
 Chilocarpus steenisianus Markgr. - Borneo
 Chilocarpus suaveolens Blume - Borneo, Sumatra, Java
 Chilocarpus torulosus (Boerl.) Markgr. - Borneo
 Chilocarpus vernicosus Blume - Borneo, Sumatra, W Malaysia

References

Apocynaceae genera
Rauvolfioideae